Strangling Threads is a 1923 British silent drama film directed by Cecil M. Hepworth and starring Alma Taylor, Campbell Gullan and James Carew.

Plot
A millionaire thinks he kills a blackmailing Mexican wife who dies of shock.

Cast
 Alma Taylor as Irma Brian  
 Campbell Gullan as Martin Forsdyke KC  
 James Carew as Stephen Mallard  
 Mary Dibley as Dolorosa  
 Eileen Dennes as Miss Debb  
 Gwynne Herbert as Mrs. Brian  
 John MacAndrews as Inspector Beall  
 Maud Cressall as Coroner's Wife  
 Louis Goodrich as Coroner  
 Lyell Johnstone

References

Bibliography
 Quinlan, David. The Illustrated Who's Who in British Films. B.T. Batsford, 1978.

External links

1923 films
British drama films
British silent feature films
1923 drama films
Films directed by Cecil Hepworth
Hepworth Pictures films
British black-and-white films
1920s English-language films
1920s British films
Silent drama films